Yeni can refer to:

 Yeni, Acıpayam, Turkey
 Yeni, Bago, Myanmar
 Yeni, Katha Township, Myanmar
 Yeni, Mahlaing Township, Myanmar
 Yeni, Tavas, Turkey